Giriyal Kariyat Bagewadi is a village in the Bailhongal taluk of Belgaum district in the southern Indian state of Karnataka. As of the 2011 Indian census, it had a population of 609.

References

Villages in Belagavi district